George Mudie may refer to:

 George Mudie (politician) (born 1945), politician in the United Kingdom
 George Mudie (cricketer) (1915–2002), West Indian cricketer
 George Mudie (social reformer) (1788–?), Scottish publisher and Owenite

See also
 George Moody (born 1942), Canadian politician
 George Moodie (1872–1954), Australian rules player